Roxana Zal (born November 8, 1969) is an American former actress and fashion designer. In 1984, at the age of 14, she became the youngest Primetime Emmy Award winner for her title role in the television film Something About Amelia.

Life and career
Zal was born and raised in Malibu, California, the daughter of Maureen and Hossein Zal, an Iranian-born Los Angeles investor. Her first acting role was a guest spot on Hart to Hart at age 12.

In 1983, Zal appeared in the films Table for Five starring Jon Voight and Testament opposite Jane Alexander. In 1984 she won a Primetime Emmy Award for her role in the television film Something About Amelia. She also received a Golden Globe Award for Best Supporting Actress – Series, Miniseries or Television Film nomination for her performance. Zal later starred in the 1986 independent crime film River's Edge and in 1989 starred in the teen romantic drama film Under the Boardwalk.

In 1990, Zal appeared in a number of made-for-television and independent films playing supporting roles. She also guest starred in a number of television series, including Lois & Clark: The New Adventures of Superman, The Pretender and NCIS. In 2006, she was a regular cast member on the MyNetworkTV telenovela Watch Over Me. Zal left acting and became a fashion designer in the 2000s.

Filmography

Film

Television

References

External links

1969 births
American child actresses
American film actresses
American people of Iranian descent
American television actresses
Actresses from California
Outstanding Performance by a Supporting Actress in a Miniseries or Movie Primetime Emmy Award winners
People from Malibu, California
Living people
21st-century American women